Hervé Saulignac is a French politician representing the Socialist Party. He was elected to the French National Assembly on 18 June 2017, representing the department of Ardèche.

See also
 2017 French legislative election
 List of deputies of the 15th National Assembly of France
 List of deputies of the 16th National Assembly of France

References

Place of birth missing (living people)
Year of birth missing (living people)
Living people
Deputies of the 15th National Assembly of the French Fifth Republic
Socialist Party (France) politicians

21st-century French politicians
Deputies of the 16th National Assembly of the French Fifth Republic